Cultural materialism is an anthropological research orientation first introduced by Marvin Harris in his 1968 book The Rise of Anthropological Theory, as a theoretical paradigm and research strategy. It is said to be the most enduring achievement of that work. Harris subsequently developed a full elaboration and defense of the paradigm in his 1979 book Cultural Materialism. To Harris social change is dependent of three factors: a society's infrastructure, structure, and superstructure.

Harris's concept of cultural materialism was influenced by the writings of Karl Marx and Friedrich Engels, as well as their theories as modified by Karl August Wittfogel and his 1957 book, Oriental Despotism: A Comparative Study of Total Power. Yet this  materialism is distinct from Marxist dialectical materialism, as well as from philosophical materialism. Thomas Malthus's work encouraged Harris to consider reproduction of equal importance to production. The research strategy was also influenced by the work of earlier anthropologists including Herbert Spencer, Edward Tylor and Lewis Henry Morgan who, in the 19th century, first proposed that cultures evolved from the less complex to the more complex over time. Leslie White and Julian Steward and their theories of cultural evolution and cultural ecology were instrumental in the reemergence of evolutionist theories of culture in the 20th century and Harris took inspiration from them in formulating cultural materialism.

Epistemological principles
Cultural materialism is a scientific research strategy and as such utilizes the scientific method. Other important principles include operational definitions, Karl Popper's falsifiability, Thomas Kuhn's paradigms, and the positivism first proposed by Auguste Comte and popularized by the Vienna Circle. The primary question that arises in applying the techniques of science to understand the differences and similarities between cultures is how the research strategy "treats the relationship between what people say and think as subjects and what they say and think and do as objects of scientific inquiry". In response to this cultural materialism makes a distinction between behavioral events and ideas, values, and other mental events.

It also makes the distinction between emic and etic operations. Emic operations, within cultural materialism, are ones in which the descriptions and analyses are acceptable by the native as real, meaningful, and appropriate. Etic operations are ones in which the categories and concepts used are those of the observer and are able to generate scientific theories. The research strategy prioritizes etic behavior phenomena.

Theoretical principles
 Etic and behavioral infrastructure, comprising a society's relations to the environment, which includes their ethics and behavioral modes of production and reproduction (material relations).
 Etic and behavioral Structure, the ethics and behavioral domestic and political economies of a society (social relations).
 Etic and behavioral Superstructure, the ethics and behavioral symbolic and ideational aspects of a society, e.g. the arts, rituals, sports and games, and science (symbolic and ideational relations).
 Emic and mental Superstructure, including "conscious and unconscious cognitive goals, categories, rules, plans, values, philosophies, and beliefs" (meaningful or ideological relations).

Within this division of culture, cultural materialism argues for what is referred to as the principle of probabilistic infrastructural determinism.  The essence of its materialist approach is that the infrastructure is in almost all circumstances the most significant force behind the evolution of a culture. Structure and superstructure are not considered "insignificant, epiphenomenal reflexes of infrastructural forces". The structure and symbolic/ideational aspects act as regulating mechanisms within the system as a whole.

The research strategy predicts that it is more likely that in the long term infrastructure probabilistically determines structure, which probabilistically determines the superstructures, than otherwise. Thus, much as in earlier Marxist thought, material changes (such as in technology or environment) are seen as largely determining patterns of social organization and ideology in turn.

Disagreement with Marxism
In spite of the debt owed to the economic theories of Marx and Engels, cultural materialism rejects the Marxist dialectic which in turn was based on the theories of the philosopher Georg Wilhelm Friedrich Hegel.

Research 
During the 1980s, Marvin Harris had a productive interchange with behavioral psychologists, most notably Sigrid Glenn, regarding interdisciplinary work.  Very recently, behavioral psychologists have produced a set of basic exploratory experiments in an effort toward this end. More recently young anthropologists have re-approached the work of Marvin Harris as part of a new anthropology of infrastructures.

See also
Marvin Harris
Maxine Margolis
Jerald T. Milanich

References

Anthropology
Ecology
Historical determinism
Materialism